Chitnahalli Guru Dutt is an Indian actor and director, primarily concentrating on Kannada and Tamil films. He is the son of Chi. Udaya Shankar.

Career
He debuted along with Shivrajkumar in the Kannada film Anand (1986). He was launched in Tamil by K. Balachander with Pudhu Pudhu Arthangal (1989). His major Tamil appearance in the thriller film Kalaignan (1993) opposite Kamal Haasan as the psychopath doctor. He has acted in more than 100 films. 

Chi Guru Dutt has also directed Aryan starring Shivarajkumar, Ramya and Sarath Babu

Filmography

Actor
 Kannada

Anand (1986)
Samyuktha (1988)
Inspector Vikram (1989)
Kitturina Huli  (1991)
Aralida Hoovugalu (1991)
Halli Rambhe Belli Bombe (1991)
Belli Kalungura (1992)
Nagaradalli Nayakaru (1992)
Mannina Doni (1992)
Jeevana Chaitra (1992)
Ananda Jyothi (1993)
Chirabandhavya (1993)
Jaga Mechida Huduga (1993)
Kalavida (1997)
Goonda Matthu Police (1998)
Shabdavedhi (2000)
Soorappa (2000)
Usire (2001)
Kotigobba (2001)
Sri Manjunatha (2001)
Raja Narasimha (2003)
Kadamba (2004)
Nija (2004)
Magic Ajji (2005)
Uppi Dada M.B.B.S. (2006)
Jeeva (2009)
Circus (2009)
Bombat (2009)
Mukhaputa (2009)
Minugu (2010)
Shankar IPS (2010)
Vinayaka Geleyara Balaga (2011)
Edegarike(2012)
Bharath Stores (2012)
Shiva (2012)
Breaking News (2012)
Whistle (2013)
Belli (2014)
...Re (2016)
Mass Leader(2017)
Srikanta (2017)
Chakravarthy (2017)
 Gimmick (2019)

 Yuvarathnaa (2021)

 Tamil
Pudhu Pudhu Arthangal (1989)
Varavu Nalla Uravu (1990)
Ennarukil Nee Irunthal (1991)
Amman Kaatiya Vazhi (1991)
Kalaignan (1993)
En Uyir Nee Thaane (1998)
Ponnu Veetukkaran (1999)
Appu  (2000)

Telugu
Sri Manjunatha (2001)

Director
Samara (1995)
Dattha (2006)
Kaamannana Makkalu (2008)
Kiccha Huccha (2010)
Aryan (2014)

Television

References

External links

Personal Profile of Chi Guru Dutt 

Indian male film actors
Male actors from Karnataka
Male actors in Kannada cinema
Male actors in Tamil cinema
Kannada film directors
20th-century Indian male actors
20th-century births
Living people
Year of birth missing (living people)
21st-century Indian male actors
Film directors from Karnataka
Male actors in Telugu cinema